Shoal Lake is the name of several lakes in Ontario:

Shoal Lake (Kenora District, Ontario) 
Shoal Lake (Rainy River District, Ontario) 
Shoal Lake (Nipissing District, Ontario)
Shoal Lake (Parry Sound District, Ontario)
Shoal Lake (Thunder Bay District, Ontario) 
Shoal Lake (Algoma District, Ontario)

See also
Shoal Lake (disambiguation)